Fascism in Africa refers to the phenomenon of fascist parties and movements that were active in Africa.

Overview
There is significant controversy regarding which, if any, political movements and governments in Africa can be considered fascist. American historian and political scientist Robert Paxton, a scholar on the topic of fascism, has rejected the idea that there have been indigenous fascist movements in Africa, claiming that there have been no prominent examples of fascist regimes amongst Third World dictatorships. Paxton also rejects the view that Idi Amin's rule in Uganda was fascist in nature. However, other scholars assert that there have been indigenous fascist regimes in Africa. Swiss historian Max-Liniger-Goumaz, a scholar on African history, has identified multiple African regimes as being examples of the phenomenon of "Afro-fascism", including: Francisco Macías Nguema's regime in Equatorial Guinea, Mobutu Sese Seko's regime in Zaire, Idi Amin's regime in Uganda, Gnassingbé Eyadéma's regime in Togo, and Mengistu Haile Mariam's regime in Ethiopia. The Coalition for the Defence of the Republic has been regarded as a Rwandan Hutu fascist political party which was responsible for inciting the Rwandan genocide.

Such notions of indigenous African fascism have generally been excluded, often explicitly, from political science typologies of fascism. As well as Paxton, Roger Griffin rejects the notion that fascism existed in Africa (outside South Africa) in his book The Nature of Fascism, by arguing that African dictatorships do not seek the mass mobilization of their populations which is necessary for a regime to be called fascist, and African political groups could not construct unifying nationalist palingenetic myths (another precondition for true fascism) because African national borders were often arbitrarily set by colonial powers and tribal, religious and ethnic loyalties are frequently much stronger than national identities are. For Griffin a precondition for the rise of fascism is the breakdown of a traditional society which is combined with increasing liberalisation against the backdrop of socio-political instability, which also rules out post-colonial Africa where such liberalisation did not take place until very recently, because post-colonial regimes frequently transformed themselves into dictatorships, either actual or effective.

Paul Hayes accepts the view that individual African countries may demonstrate some characteristics of fascism, notably aspects of the regimes of Hastings Banda in Malawi or Abeid Karume in Zanzibar, but he argues that  none of the current leaders of African states can truly be called fascists on an academic basis. Similarly, Stanley G. Payne contends that while a one-party nationalist dictatorship may have been seen as the model in some African states, none of these states can genuinely be considered fascist because the single parties which control them usually have a small membership and they often do not exist at any more than a basic functional level, their political economies do not follow the corporatist or national syndicalist models which define fascism and there is no philosophical or political culture of fascism, because such African regimes are highly pragmatic and they are even non-ideological in nature. Indeed, the notion of true fascism, as opposed to the notion of a mere dictatorship, was further eroded in Africa during the 1970s when many regimes added an ideological dimension in the shape of Marxism-Leninism.

South Africa
South Africa's status as an independent country was dominated by the White South African minority, which meant that it shared a number of characteristics with Europe where fascism originally developed. South Africa also had an institutionalised form of racism in the apartheid system.

Nazism found an audience in the country, with pro-Nazi elements organised by Louis Weichardt in 1932 under the name South African Gentile National Socialist Movement, a group that soon became known as the Greyshirts. Although the group enjoyed some support and continued after the Second World War they never became sufficiently important for the government to take action against them. The other main fascist group was the Ossewabrandwag (OB), founded in 1939, a group also inspired by Adolf Hitler. The two differed however as the Greyshirts emphasised Aryan race rhetoric and so organised amongst the various white immigrant communities whilst the OB were specifically for Afrikaners only. A third, more minor group, the New Order, emerged in 1940 under the leadership of former cabinet minister Oswald Pirow. After the Second World War Pirow became an important figure in neo-fascism, working closely with Oswald Mosley, Nation Europa and A. F. X. Baron. Nazi Germany sought to encourage such activity with former Olympic boxer Robey Leibbrandt active as an agent for the Abwehr during the war. The Nazi Party itself also organised until it was outlawed in 1936.

In the post-war era, far right groups that are sometimes characterised as being neo-fascist in nature include the Afrikaner Weerstandsbeweging, the Vereniging van Oranjewerkers, the Herstigte Nasionale Party and the Boeremag; as well, there are fascist elements within the coalition Afrikaner Volksfront.

North Africa
North Africa has also seen activity that has sometimes been identified as fascism. The high level of movement between France and French North Africa meant that political ideas travelled between the regions; indeed, as early as the 1890s the proto-fascist Antisemitic League of France was active in Algiers. It was not until later however that indigenous versions began to emerge. In 1930s Egypt the Young Egypt movement, known as the greenshirts, became important. They followed the models of fascist groups in Europe and praised Italian fascism and Nazism, although they largely supported existing elites. Within the Egyptian Army General 'Aziz 'Ali al-Misri (1878-1965) was noted for his fascist sympathies, to the extent that he was dismissed as Chief of Staff in 1940. Masri deserted the army and attempted to link up with the Afrika Korps but was arrested before he could escape.

In Italian Libya, Benito Mussolini sought to gain popularity by presenting himself as a defender of Islam and he formed a Libyan Arab Fascist Party to which indigenous people were admitted. This was not the case in Ethiopia, where resistance was much fiercer and fascism did not take root. In both colonies, though, fascist youth movements were formed under Italian tutelage (Arab Lictor Youth and Ethiopian Lictor Youth).

East Africa
Like North Africa, the east of the continent saw some early development amongst white immigrant communities. A number of pro-fascist aristocrats, including Josslyn Hay, 22nd Earl of Erroll and Gerard Wallop, 9th Earl of Portsmouth, made their homes in Kenya during the 1930s. Although too few in number to form any meaningful political grouping they nonetheless maintained close links to the British Union of Fascists, of which most had been members. Other white settlers organised pro-Nazi groups in Rhodesia during the Second World War.

The Coalition for the Defence of the Republic (CDR) has been described as a Rwandan Hutu fascist political party responsible for inciting the Rwandan genocide. The CDR refused to operate within the law nor cooperate with other Rwandan political parties. The CDR had a paramilitary wing, the Impuzamugambi that repeatedly provoked violent confrontations with members of other parties, using hand grenades and bombs, and served as one of the death squads that massacred Tutsis in the Rwandan Genocide.

Parallels have frequently been drawn between Hitler and Uganda's Idi Amin and it has been claimed that Amin's admiration for Hitler was so great that he even intended to build a statue of him. American political scientist and historian Robert Paxton, a scholar on fascism, has stated, that from an ideological standpoint he shared little or nothing with proper fascism, sharing only cruelty and anti-Semitism with Hitler. However, Swiss historian Max-Liniger-Goumaz, a scholar on African history, has identified Idi Amin amongst a list of other African leaders as being an example of the phenomenon of "Afro-fascism".

West Africa
During World War II, the French colonies in West Africa sided with Vichy France, a German puppet state.

See also
 Tropical fascism
 Fascism in Asia
 Fascism in Europe
 Fascism in North America
 Fascism in South America
 List of fascist movements
 List of fascist movements by country

References

 
Politics of Africa